ProgPower Europe (formerly ProgPower) is a progressive metal festival held annually in the Netherlands since 1999. Notable headliners have included Sons of Apollo, Evergrey, and Caligula's Horse.

History 

The beginnings of ProgPower Europe started in November 1998 by René Janssen (mostly known from his activities for the Dutch Progressive Rock Pages) decided the time had come for a special event in the progressive metal scene. So he started looking around for other prog metal fans who would be willing to organise a festival with him. The first ProgPower Europe took place in November 1999 at 013 in Tilburg, Netherlands. All the follow on events have taken place at Sjiwa in Baarlo, Netherlands.

ProgPower Europe Specials 

Some special performances were given at ProgPower Europe:

 In 2008 Wolverine played both on Saturday 4 October and on Sunday 5 October. On Saturday they played the same set they played 10 years before when they were headlining the first ProgPower festival. On Sunday they played their regular 2008 set.
 In 2009 Evergrey surprised everybody with an acoustic set during the diner break.
 In 2012 Persefone played Thursday night before ProgPower Europe in memory of Mikko Laine, who died in a truck accident the year before. Mikko Laine was the guitarplayer in the Finnish band Sole Remedy.
 In 2013 Damian Wilson was doing an acoustic set and standup show (!). He also jumped on a table outside the venue during a break playing acoustic guitar and sing-a-long songs with the ProgPower family.
 In 2014 Pain of Salvation played the whole of Remedy Lane, in addition to a regular set.

Lineups

References

External links 

 

Music festivals in the Netherlands
Heavy metal festivals in the Netherlands
1999 establishments in the Netherlands
Music festivals established in 1999